Norman Leonard Barnes (born August 24, 1953) is a Canadian former professional ice hockey defenceman who played five seasons in the National Hockey League (NHL) for the Philadelphia Flyers and Hartford Whalers. He featured in the 1980 Stanley Cup Finals with the Flyers.

He also played for Canada in the 1981 IIHF ice hockey world championships in Stockholm, Sweden.

As a youth, he played in the 1965 and 1966 Quebec International Pee-Wee Hockey Tournaments with the Toronto Bruins and Toronto Shopsy's minor ice hockey teams.

Awards and honours

Played in NHL All-Star Game (1980)
AHL First All-Star Team (1982)

Career statistics

Regular season and playoffs

International

References

External links
 

1953 births
Living people
AHCA Division I men's ice hockey All-Americans
Baltimore Clippers (SHL) players
Binghamton Whalers players
Canadian ice hockey defencemen
Cincinnati Stingers draft picks
Hartford Whalers players
Maine Mariners players
Michigan State Spartans men's ice hockey players
National Hockey League All-Stars
Philadelphia Firebirds (NAHL) players
Philadelphia Flyers draft picks
Philadelphia Flyers players
Richmond Robins players
Sportspeople from Etobicoke
Ice hockey people from Toronto
Springfield Indians players